Sheykh Jan (also Romanized as Sheykh Jān) is a village in Sarajuy-ye Sharqi Rural District, Saraju District, Maragheh County, East Azerbaijan Province, Iran. At the 2006 census, its population was 250, in 53 families.

References 

Towns and villages in Maragheh County